Samuel Atkins Eliot may refer to:

 Samuel A. Eliot (minister) (1862–1950), American Unitarian minister
 Samuel Atkins Eliot (politician) (1798–1862), U.S. Representative from Massachusetts
 Samuel Atkins Eliot Jr. (1893–1984), American author

Samuel Atkins Eliot (politician) was father of Charles W. Eliot who was father of Samuel A. Eliot (minister) who was father of Samuel Atkins Eliot Jr.

See also 
 Samuel Eliot (disambiguation)